Kevin Loiselle (born May 13, 1988) is a Canadian professional basketball player. In 2017, he was selected to participate in Indonesian Basketball League Allstar game.

College career
Loiselle was a second-team All-Collégial AAA selection with Dawson College in 2008.

Professional career
Loiselle has been named to multiple NBL All-Canada Teams and was named an NBL Canada All-Star in 2014. He was selected by the Express with the 1st  pick in the second round of the 2012 NBL Canada draft. He helped the team capture two league titles.

On November 4, 2015, Loiselle signed with the London Lightning, remaining in the Canadian league. Team head coach Kyle Julius said, "If you watched him play last year he looked like a small cog in the wheel, but I don't think he was valued enough." But on February 16, 2016, Loiselle left the Lightning, with the team retaining his NBL Canada playing rights.  At the time, Loiselle planned on playing in the Dominican Republic.

On March 11, 2016, Loiselle was traded by the Lightning to the Halifax Hurricanes in exchange for Anthony Criswell.

In October 2016, Loiselle sign with Pacific Caesar Surabaya to play in Perbasi Cup 2016, then Loiselle continued playing with Pacific Caesar until in Indonesian Basketball League 2017.

References

External links

USBasket.com profile
FIBA profile
Kevin Loiselle at RealGM

1988 births
Living people
Basketball players from Montreal
Canadian expatriate basketball people in the United States
Canadian men's basketball players
Cape Breton Highlanders (basketball) players
Dawson College alumni
Forwards (basketball)
Halifax Hurricanes players
UMFK Bengals men's basketball players
Windsor Express players